The L. V. Hightower Unit (HI) or Hightower Unit is a prison in Texas, United States, within the Texas Department of Corrections system. It is located in unincorporated Liberty County, near Dayton, Texas. It is named for Lockhart V. Hightower, former sheriff and county clerk of Liberty County.

References

External links
Hightower Unit

Prisons in Liberty County, Texas
1990 establishments in Texas